K&N's is a Pakistani multinational poultry and frozen food company based in Karachi, Pakistan. It was founded in 1964 by Khalil Sattar with his wife, Naushaba Khalil, hence the company name K&N's.

It is engaged in integrated poultry operations including breeding, hatching, feed milling, broiler growing, poultry processing and production of Halal ready-to-cook and fully cooked chicken products.

K&N's is categorized into two areas:
 K&N's Poultry, which had parent stock production unit, day-old chicks, feed and broilers, and
 K&N's Foods to control processed chicken and ready-to-cook and fully cooked chicken products.
K&N's produces a wide range of poultry products, including whole chickens, chicken parts, ready-to-cook and ready-to-eat products, and value-added products such as burgers, nuggets, and sausages.

History
K&N's was founded by a college student, Khalil Sattar and his wife Naushaba Khalil, in 1964.

In 2011, K&N's became "one of the largest broiler-chick producers and the market leader for the processed chicken products in Pakistan".

In August 2016, the company won five medals at IFFA in Germany.

References

Food and drink companies established in 1964
Pakistani brands
Frozen food brands
Food manufacturers of Pakistan
Food and drink companies based in Karachi
Multinational companies headquartered in Pakistan
Privately held companies of Pakistan
Pakistani companies established in 1964